Hydnellum suaveolens is an inedible fungus often found beneath conifers. As its name suggests, it has a strong odor of anise or peppermint.

References

External links
Roger's Mushrooms Description

Fungi described in 1772
Fungi of North America
Inedible fungi
suaveolens